NGC 6047 is an elliptical galaxy located about 430 million light-years away in the constellation Hercules. It was discovered by astronomer Lewis Swift on June 27, 1886. NGC 6047 is a member of the Hercules Cluster.

NGC 6047 has a peculiar morphology which suggests it has undergone a recent merger. It may be interacting with NGC 6045 which lies around ~ away. NGC 6047 has two radio jets and is classified as a FR I radio galaxy. The jets appear to have a Z-shaped structure.

See also
 NGC 1128

References

External links

Elliptical galaxies
Peculiar galaxies
Radio galaxies
Hercules Cluster

Hercules (constellation)
6047
57033
+3-41-87
+17.66
Astronomical objects discovered in 1886